George D. Myers was a Major League Baseball player. He played six seasons in the majors, from  until , for the Buffalo Bisons, St. Louis Maroons, and Indianapolis Hoosiers.

Sources

Major League Baseball catchers
Buffalo Bisons (NL) players
St. Louis Maroons players
Indianapolis Hoosiers (NL) players
Minneapolis Millers (baseball) players
Syracuse Stars (minor league baseball) players
Utica Stars players
Rochester Flour Cities players
Baseball players from Buffalo, New York
1860 births
1926 deaths
19th-century baseball players